Unió Esportiva Tàrrega is a Spanish football team based in Tàrrega, in the autonomous community of Catalonia. Founded in 1957, it plays in First Catalonia, holding home games at Municipal Joan Capdevila, with a capacity of 3,501 seats.

Seasons

14 seasons in Tercera Division

References

External links
UE Tarrega Official Web

Football clubs in Catalonia
Association football clubs established in 1916
Divisiones Regionales de Fútbol clubs
1916 establishments in Spain